Saint Elian may refer to:

Saint Elian (Wales) (fl. 450) also Llanelian, Catholic saint who founded a church in North Wales  
Saint Elian (Syria) (died 284 CE), Roman Orthodox saint from Homs martyred for refusing to renounce Christianity
Church of Saint Elian in Homs, Syria
Monastery of St. Elian in Al-Qaryatayn, Syria

See also
Elian (disambiguation)
Eglwysilan
Llanelian (disambiguation)